Dame Virginia Anne McKenna,  (born 7 June 1931) is a British stage and screen actress, author, animal rights activist, and wildlife campaigner. She is best known for the films A Town Like Alice (1956), Carve Her Name with Pride (1958), Born Free (1966), and Ring of Bright Water (1969), as well as her work with the Born Free Foundation.

Early life
McKenna was born in Marylebone to a theatrical family and was educated at Heron's Ghyll School, a former independent boarding school near the market town of Horsham in Sussex. She spent six years in South Africa before returning to the school at the age of fourteen, after which she attended the Central School of Speech and Drama, at that time based at the Royal Albert Hall, London.

Career
Aged 19, McKenna spent six months at Dundee Repertory Theatre. She worked on stage in London's West End theatre, making her debut in Penny for a Song. She attracted attention on TV appearing in Winter's Tale with John Gielgud and Shout Aloud Salvation.

McKenna's first film was The Second Mrs Tanqueray (1952), followed by a comedy, Father's Doing Fine (1952). She had a small role in the popular war film The Cruel Sea (1953) and a better part in the low budget comedy The Oracle (1953). She received excellent reviews for her stage performance in The River Line.

From 1954 to 1955 she was a member of the Old Vic theatre company, appearing in Henry IV and Richard II, and was married for a few months in 1954 to actor Denholm Elliott, whom she met on the set of The Cruel Sea. Their marriage ended owing to his affairs with men. In 1957, she married actor Bill Travers, with whom she had four children and to whom she remained married until his death in 1994.

McKenna returned to films with Simba (1955), a drama about the Mau Mau, playing Dirk Bogarde's love interest. Rank signed her to a long term contract and director Brian Desmond Hurst said "She has a terrific future, properly handled. She has all the qualities of a young
Bergman and a young Katharine Hepburn. McKenna was also in The Ship That Died of Shame (1955).

Stardom
McKenna was given the lead role in the war time drama A Town Like Alice (1956), opposite Peter Finch. The movie was a big hit at the box office and McKenna won the BAFTA Award for Best Actress for her performance. Exhibitors voted her the fourth most popular British star. In October 1956, John Davis, managing director of Rank, announced her as one of the actors under contract that Davis thought would become an international star.

Travers and McKenna received an offer to go to Hollywood to appear in The Barretts of Wimpole Street (1957). Travers played Robert Browning and McKenna had the support part of Elizabeth Barrett Browning's sister. The movie flopped at the box office. The same year, Travers and McKenna, along with Margaret Rutherford and Peter Sellers, co-starred in the comedy The Smallest Show on Earth, made back in Britain.

McKenna had another hit with Carve Her Name with Pride (1958), playing Second World War SOE agent Violette Szabo. She was nominated for another BAFTA Award and was voted the fifth most popular British star of 1958 (and the ninth most popular regardless of nationality).

She and Travers were reunited in Passionate Summer (1959), then she had a support part in MGM's The Wreck of the Mary Deare (1959). McKenna and Travers were also in Two Living, One Dead (1961), shot in Sweden. She was in an adaptation of A Passage to India for the BBC in 1965.

Born Free
McKenna is best remembered for her 1966 role as Joy Adamson in the true-life film Born Free for which she received a nomination for a Golden Globe. It was not only a huge success at the box office but a life changing experience for her and her husband Bill Travers who co-starred with her, portraying game warden and conservationist George Adamson. The experience led them to become active supporters for wild animal rights as well as the protection of their natural habitat.

McKenna and Travers starred in another animal-themed story, Ring of Bright Water (1969), but it failed to match Born Free's success.

McKenna appeared in An Elephant Called Slowly. The film features her close friend conservationist George Adamson and also elephants Eleanor (brought up by conservationist Daphne Sheldrick) and young Pole Pole. The subsequent premature death of Pole Pole in London Zoo led to McKenna and her husband to establish Zoo Check in 1984 with their eldest son Will Travers. Zoo Check was renamed Born Free Foundation in 1991. In 1984 McKenna was involved with a protest against the poor conditions at Southampton Zoo which was closed a year later.

Later career
McKenna occasionally acted in films, notably Waterloo (1970), Swallows and Amazons (1974), The Gathering Storm (1974), and Beauty and the Beast (1976).

On the stage, in 1979 she won the Olivier Award for Best Actress in a British musical for her performance opposite Yul Brynner in The King and I. Over the years she appeared in more films but was also very active with television roles and on stage where she continues to make occasional appearances.

McKenna has also been responsible for helping create and furnish the Gavin Maxwell Museum on Eilean Bàn, the last island home of Maxwell, an author and naturalist, most famous for his book Ring of Bright Water. McKenna and husband Bill Travers starred in the 1969 film adaptation of the book.

McKenna is still actively involved at Born Free Foundational a Trustee.

Honours
McKenna was appointed Officer of the Order of the British Empire (OBE) in the 2004 New Year Honours for services to wildlife and the arts and Dame Commander of the Order of the British Empire (DBE) in the 2023 New Year Honours for services to wildlife conservation and wild animal welfare.

Personal life

McKenna and Travers had four children together, one of whom is Will Travers. She is the grandmother of actress Lily Travers.

In 1975, she released an album of twelve songs called Two Faces of Love, which included two of her own compositions and a sung version of the poem "The Life That I Have" from the film Carve Her Name with Pride. The record was released on the Gold Star label with two line drawings of McKenna by her sister-in-law Linden Travers, but these were replaced by a photograph when the album was reissued on the Rim label in 1979.

Her audiobook work includes The Secret Garden by Frances Hodgson Burnett, and narration of The Lonely Doll by Dare Wright.

McKenna is a vegetarian. She is a patron of Cinnamon Trust, a national charity that helps elderly people to keep their pets.

Her autobiography, The Life in My Years, was published by Oberon Books in March 2009.

Filmography

Non-fiction films
The Lions are Free is the real life continuation of Born Free. This film tells about what happened to the lions that were in the film Born Free. Bill Travers, who had starred with McKenna, wrote, produced and directed the film, along with James Hill, the director of Born Free. Travers and Hill went to a remote area in Kenya to visit with the noted conservationist George Adamson. The film has scenes of George and Bill interacting with lions who are living free.
Christian: The Lion at World's End is a documentary (with a re-enaction sequence at the beginning) about the now-famous lion's journey from a London store to George Adamson's reserve in Kenya. Virginia McKenna and her husband, Bill Travers, had a chance meeting with Christian and his owners Ace Bourke and John Rendall. Through McKenna and Travers' connection with George Adamson, the lion was successfully brought to Africa and taught how to fend for himself.

Bibliography
On Playing With Lions, (with Bill Travers) Collins, (1966) 
Some of My Friends Have Tails, Collins (1971) 
Into the Blue, Aquarian Press, (1992) 
Journey to Freedom, (with help from Will Travers; illustrated by Nick Mountain) Templar (1997) .

Discography
Two Faces of Love LP, Gold Star 15-030, 1975. Reissued as Rim RIM 5001, 1979.
The Love That I Have (Violette)/Homage to Renoir 45 rpm single, Sovereign SOV 125, 1974.
The Love That I Have/Send in the Clowns 45 rpm single, RIM 002, 1979.

References

External links

Born Free Foundation
Photos from Virginia Mckenna and the Lions from the film Born Free
Eilean Bàn - home to the Gavin Maxwell museum, author of Ring of Bright Water, eileanban.org. Accessed 30 December 2022.
2004 Virginia McKenna Brief profile
The Cinnamon Trust, cinnamon.org.uk. Accessed 30 December 2022.
British Entertainment History Project interview, historyproject.org.uk. Accessed 30 December 2022.

1931 births
20th-century English actresses
21st-century English actresses
Living people
Actresses awarded damehoods
Actresses from London
Alumni of the Royal Central School of Speech and Drama
Best British Actress BAFTA Award winners
Best Actress BAFTA Award (television) winners
Dames Commander of the Order of the British Empire
English animal rights activists
English autobiographers
English film actresses
English stage actresses
English television actresses
Laurence Olivier Award winners
People from Marylebone